Miss Grand Thailand 2023 (Thai: มิสแกรนด์ไทยแลนด์ 2023) will be the 10th edition of the Miss Grand Thailand beauty pageant, scheduled to be held at Show DC Hall in the capital city of Bangkok on 29 April 2023, while the initial pageant activities was decided to be done in the province of Chiang Mai. Engfa Waraha of Bangkok will crown her successor at the end of the event. The winner will represent the country at Miss Grand International 2023 in Vietnam.

Background

Location and date
During the live streaming on the personal Facebook page on 6 May 2022, Nawat Itsaragrisil, the president of Miss Grand International, stated that the grand final of 2023 Miss Grand Thailand is scheduled to happen on 29 April 2023 at Show DC Hall, the delegates for such an edition will also be selected through the provincial pageants as accomplished in previous editions. In addition to an online Thai government lottery dealer company, VR Online Innovation,  which has been served as the main title sponsorship since 2022, the cosmeceutical brand "Devonte" was also certificated as the premier patronage organ for this edition.

Sponsorship

Selection of contestants

Overview
The national finalists for Miss Grand Thailand 2023 were chosen through the provincial pageants held by the different provincial licensees, who in some cases are responsible for more than one province, e.g., Piriya Siannok, who holds the licenses for Amnat Charoen, Chai Nat, Chumphon, Nan, Nong Bua Lamphu, Prachinburi, and Trang.

As announced on the grand final stage of the previous edition, former runners-up of Miss Grand Thailand are permitted to re-participate in the contest, nevertheless, the organizer's president later proclaimed on his personal social media that the pageant candidates with a history of participating in any right-wing pageants, such as Miss Universe Thailand and Miss Thailand, will have been prohibited to acquired any placements or special awards in Miss Grand Thailand pageant, beginning in 2023.

Of all participating candidates, the representative of Chonburi province, Ratrapee Thamjalkul, was appointed as the replacement for the original winner, Kritsadaporn Nakrai, who was dethroned by the provincial licensee for not being able to fulfill the duties. The provincial licensee claimed several reasons for such dethronement; Nakrai, however, thereupon publicized an argument on her private social media to deny all allegations and claimed that the content previously published by the provincial organizer caused a misunderstanding. She then participated at another provincial preliminary pageant, Miss Grand Mukdahan 2023, but did not win the main title.

Provincial preliminary contests
The following is a list of the provinces that held the provincial preliminary contests for Miss Grand Thailand 2023.

Pageant

Pre-pageant activities

Main pageant

Candidates

Seventy-seven contestants have been confirmed to participate:

Notes 

 Replacements

References

External links

 Miss Grand Thailand official website

Grand Thailand
Miss Grand Thailand
Beauty pageants in Thailand